Titus Salt School formerly called Salt Grammar School located in Baildon, West Yorkshire, England is a former grammar school, now a mixed comprehensive school, for students aged 11–18. It is a specialist school in Mathematics and Computing. The Headteacher is Ian Morrel, who took up the role in September 2012.

Academic standards
The Ofsted report of their inspection of 31 January – 4 February 2005 said "Salt Grammar School is an effective school and specialist mathematics and computing college in which standards are rising. There is a way to go, but the school has an outstandingly clear sense of purpose and all the right measures are in place for all students to keep on doing well. Leadership and governance are very good. Parents and students are supportive of a school that provides a good quality of education, has a cost-effective sixth form and provides good value for money."

Years 7–13
Students are taught many subjects including:

Year 7 – Maths, Science, English, a Language (one of either French, Spanish or German), Music, PE, Opening Minds, IT, Food Technology/Textile Technology, Product Design, Geography, History, RE and Art.

Year 8 & 9 – Maths, Science, English, two Languages (two out of French, Spanish and German), Music, PE, Performing Arts, IT, Food Technology/Textile Technology, Product Design, Geography, History, RE (Year 8 only), Ethics (Year 9 only) and Art.

Year 10 and Year 11 students are taught subjects that they have chosen to take as a GCSE or BTEC.
Core subjects (subjects that students must be taught) are: English, Maths, Science, PHSCE, Ethics, IT and PE.

Year 12 and 13 (6th Form) students are taught subjects they chose to take as an A Level or BTEC.

The School

When Sir Titus Salt founded his school, it was at a different site on Victoria Road in Saltaire, opposite his Victoria Hall, where it was still located in the late 1940s/early 1950s. Until around 1945, the school was segregated into boys' and girls' sections, collectively called Salt's High Schools. In those days, it was a grammar school, whereas today it is a comprehensive school.

The current Titus Salt School is housed in a new building constructed under the former Labour government's Building Schools for the Future scheme. Titus Salt School was shortlisted for this scheme and subsequently won permission to build. In September 2008, the school opened to students and the old building (Salt Grammar School) was demolished shortly after.

Awards
 Sportsmark 2007–08 award.
 International School Award 2007–10
 Investor in People

Notable former pupils
 Adrian Boothroyd, former footballer and manager.
 David Jefferies, motorcycle racer.

Salt Grammar School
 Prof Richard Eastell, Professor of Bone Metabolism at the University of Sheffield
 William Gaskill, theatre director
 Richard Illingworth, cricketer
 Jim Laker, famous English cricketer, known for a test match at Old Trafford in July 1956
 Janet Ormondroyd, Chief Executive since 2008 of Bristol City Council
 Prof Ken Pounds CBE FRS, Professor of Space Physics from 1973–2002 at the University of Leicester, Chief Executive from 1994–98 of the Particle Physics and Astronomy Research Council (PPARC), and President from 1990–92 of the Royal Astronomical Society
 Marie Studholme, actress.

References

Further reading
A century of model-village schooling: the Salt Grammar School, 1868–1968 by John Waddington-Feather. Bingley: Craven Enterprises, 1968.

External links
 Official site
 EduBase

Secondary schools in the City of Bradford
Educational institutions established in 1896
1896 establishments in England
Community schools in the City of Bradford